Albert Cheetham (7 December 1915 – 23 May 1997) was an Australian cricketer. He played twenty-four first-class matches for New South Wales between 1936 and 1946.

See also
 List of New South Wales representative cricketers

References

External links

 

1915 births
1997 deaths
Australian cricketers
New South Wales cricketers
Australian Services cricketers
Cricketers from Sydney